Mehrabad Rural District is in Rudehen District of Damavand County, Tehran province, Iran. At the National Census of 2006, its population was 2,842 in 778 households. There were 2,794 inhabitants in 768 households at the following census of 2011. At the most recent census of 2016, the population of the rural district was 6,911 in 2,059 households. The largest of its 17 villages was Mehrabad, with 5,278 people.

References 

Damavand County

Rural Districts of Tehran Province

Populated places in Tehran Province

Populated places in Damavand County